Rakshak is 1996 Indian Hindi-language action thriller film directed by Ashok Honda, starring Sunil Shetty, Karisma Kapoor, Raghuvaran, Sonali Bendre, Alok Nath and Aruna Irani. It is a remake of the Tamil film Honest Raj.

Plot
Raj and his mother come to visit village. Raj meets his best friend Raghu, and love interest Suman. They eventually marry and Raj becomes and IPS officer. Raghu starts printing fake currency to get rid of his loans and credits and becomes to mafia boss of the village. Raj finds out his secret but is attacked severely by Raghu's goons and his mother and Suman get killed. Dr. Pooja Malhotra treats him to recover and revenge his friend turned enemy Raghu.

Cast
Suniel Shetty as ASP Raj Sinha
Karishma Kapoor as Suman Sinha
Sonali Bendre as Dr. Pooja Malhotra
Raghuvaran as Raghavan "Raghu"
Aruna Irani as Raj's mother
Mushtaq Khan as Bhola
Dinesh Hingoo as Suman's father
Pramod Moutho as Bardha Seth
Ponnambalam as Danyaal
Alok Nath as Commissioner of Police
Harish Patel as Rokde
Deepak Shirke as ACP Shirke
Arun Bakshi as Advocate
Shiv Kumar Subramaniam as The photographer
Raveena Tandon in a special appearance in the song 'Shehar Ki Ladki'
Zeeshan Shaikh as Bunty

Soundtrack

After average success with the movie Anth (which was a semi-hit at the box-office), producer-director Ashok Honda again employed music directors Anand–Milind for Rakshak. Lyricist Sameer was also re-hired, but for only one song (Kuchi Kuchi). New lyricist Deepak Chowdhary wrote the remaining songs. With almost no expectations from the music of a Sunil Shetty-starrer, the music of Rakshak arrived rather quietly on the stands. But the moment Shahar Ki Ladki hit the TV channels, the song caught on with youthful listeners, and the music topped the charts. Kuchi Kuchi was another song that soon climbed the charts. With this new interest in the film's music, Ashok Honda picturised another song Sundara Sundara. The music of Rakshak topped the charts for several weeks, and Shehar Ki Ladki and Sundara Sundara still enjoy popularity.

The song "Shehar Ki Ladki" was recreated for Khandaani Shafakhana, the recreated version is sung by Tulsi Kumar and Badshah on the music of Tanishk Bagchi who has also rewritten the new song.

Awards
For this film, choreographers Chinni Prakash and Rekha Prakash won the Filmfare Award for Best Choreography for the song "Shehar Ki Ladki" at the Filmfare Awards 1997.

Reception
Box office India called the film an ″average″ grosser.

References

External links 
 

1996 films
1990s Hindi-language films
Hindi remakes of Tamil films
Films scored by Anand–Milind
1996 action thriller films
Indian action thriller films